Chan Wing-chan, BBS (born 7 July 1935) was the member of the Legislative Council in 1991–95 for the Hotels and Catering and 1998–2000 for Labour and also Provisional Legislative Council (1996–98). He was born in Jiangmen, Guangdong, China.

Chan was the chairman of the Eating Establishment Employees General Union under the Hong Kong Federation of Trade Unions. He worked closely with Beijing before the handover of Hong Kong and joined the Selection Committee which oversaw the last phrase of the transition of sovereignty and elected the first Chief Executive and Provisional Legislative Council in 1996.

References

1935 births
Living people
Members of the Provisional Legislative Council
Hong Kong trade unionists
Democratic Alliance for the Betterment and Progress of Hong Kong politicians
Hong Kong Federation of Trade Unions
HK LegCo Members 1995–1997
HK LegCo Members 1998–2000
Members of the Selection Committee of Hong Kong
Recipients of the Bronze Bauhinia Star
20th-century Chinese politicians
20th-century Hong Kong people
21st-century Hong Kong people